Chris de la Rocha (born May 15, 1979) is an American mixed martial artist who competes in the Heavyweight division. He most notably fought in the Ultimate Fighting Championship.

Background
De La Rocha was born in San Jose, California, United States. He started his MMA journey from a young age training in Jiu Jitsu where he won multiple grappling competitions.  He started training in boxing in 2010 and went on to compete in the 2010 Western States Police and Fire Games where he won the Boxing gold medal.  With that win, he decided to transitional to  compete in mixed martial arts.

Mixed martial arts career

Early career
De La Rocha made his professional debut in 2013 under Prime Fighting and defeated Matt Howell via knockout in the first round. After four fight winning streak  He was signed by UFC with a record of 4–0.

Ultimate Fighting Championship
De La Rocha made his promotional debut on July 18, 2015 at UFC Fight Night: Bisping vs. Leites against Daniel Omielanczuk replacing Konstantin Erokhin. He lost the fight via technical knockout in first round.

His second fight came on May 29, 2016 at UFC Fight Night: Almeida vs. Garbrandt against Adam Milstead. He lost the fight via technical knockout in the second round.

After a hiatus of 18 months, suffering from a bicep injury, Rocha returned to face Rashad Coulter on June 9, 2018 at UFC 225, replacing Allen Crowder. He won the fight via technical knockout in round two.

De La Rocha faced Juan Adams on December 15, 2018 at UFC on Fox 31. He lost the fight via technical knockout in the third round.

In February 2021, it was reported that Chris and UFC had parted ways.

Personal life
Rocha is a Washington State correctional officer.

Mixed martial arts record

|-
|Loss
|align=center|5–3
|Juan Adams 
|TKO (punches)
|UFC on Fox: Lee vs. Iaquinta 2
|
|align=center|3
|align=center|0:58
|Milwaukee, Wisconsin, United States
|
|-
|Win
| align=center| 5–2
| Rashad Coulter
| TKO (punches)
| UFC 225
| 
| align=center| 2
| align=center|3:53
| Chicago, Illinois, United States
|
|-
|Loss
| align=center| 4–2
| Adam Milstead
| TKO (punches)
| UFC Fight Night: Almeida vs. Garbrandt
| 
| align=center| 2
| align=center|4:01
| Las Vegas, Nevada, United States
|
|-
|Loss
| align=center| 4–1
| Daniel Omielańczuk
| TKO (punches)
| UFC Fight Night: Bisping vs. Leites
| 
| align=center| 1
| align=center| 0:48
|Glasgow, Scotland 
|
|-
| Win
| align=center| 4–0
| Matt Kovacs
| Submission (rear-naked choke)
| Prime Fighting 5
| 
| align=center| 1
| align=center| 2:34
| Ridgefield, Washington, United States
|
|-
| Win
| align=center| 3–0
| D.J. Linderman
| TKO (punches)
| WFC 25: Brawl at the Beach
| 
| align=center| 1
| align=center| 3:26
| Lincoln City, Oregon, United States
|
|-
| Win
| align=center| 2–0
| Richard Foster
| Submission (armbar)
|  Prime Fighting
| 
| align=center| 2
| align=center| 3:33
| Ridgefield, Washington, United States
|
|-
| Win
| align=center| 1–0
| Matt Howell
| KO (punch)
|  Prime Fighting
| 
| align=center| 1
| align=center|2:22
| Ridgefield, Washington, United States
|
|-

See also
 List of male mixed martial artists

References

External links
 
 

1979 births
Living people
Sportspeople from Washington (state)
American practitioners of Brazilian jiu-jitsu
American male mixed martial artists
Heavyweight mixed martial artists
Mixed martial artists utilizing boxing
Mixed martial artists utilizing Brazilian jiu-jitsu
Sportspeople from San Jose, California
Mixed martial artists from California
People from Washougal, Washington
Ultimate Fighting Championship male fighters
American male boxers